This is a list of Harlequin Romance novels released in 1972.

Releases

References 

Romance novels
Lists of novels
1972 novels